Kintzing Prichette (June 24, 1800 – April 12, 1869) was an American politician. He was primarily a political appointee within the federal government's various departments, which at the time included U.S. territories. He is best known as the last Secretary of the Michigan Territory (1835–1838), Secretary of the Oregon Territory (1849–1850), and serving a two-month term as Governor of the Oregon Territory after the resignation of General Joseph Lane. He was appointed to the last two positions by President James K. Polk.

Michigan
In 1835, Prichette was appointed as the Secretary to the Michigan Territory. He served until 1838, with Michigan becoming a state in 1837, with Prichette then serving as the first Secretary of State of Michigan.

Wisconsin Territory
Prichette purchased the title to the lands of Madison, Wisconsin, by June 1839 and began offering plots for sale to the public. In October 1839, Prichett registered the plat of Madison at the registrar's office of the then-territorial Dane County. At the time he platted the city he was residing in Detroit, Michigan. Also in 1839 he owned the American Hotel in Madison, and attempted to sell the establishment through his attorney, Moses M. Strong.

Oregon
Prichette came to Oregon from Pennsylvania and served as Territorial secretary from 1849 to 1850. He served as acting governor from June 18, 1850, to August 18, 1850. John P. Gaines had been appointed governor, but did not arrive in Oregon until August 18, when he was sworn in.

In May 1850, judge Orville C. Pratt of the Oregon Supreme Court appointed Prichette to serve as defense counsel for the Native Americans charged with the Whitman Massacre at their trial in Oregon City, Oregon after the Cayuse War. Shortly after the trial, Prichette was sworn in as governor. According to the account of U.S. Marshall Joseph Meek, Prichette ordered Meek to free the five convicted natives. But Meek refused, on the grounds that former governor Lane had already signed their death warrants, and he carried out the executions.

Little is known about Prichette today, as he is mentioned very little in the media reports of his day. No portraits or photographs have been found of him, earning him the distinction of being Oregon's only "faceless governor". Even the spelling of his last name is disputed, with at least four different spellings depending upon the historical document, including "Prichett", "Pritchett", and "Pritchette". His first name is also spelled "Kentzing".

Later years and death
After leaving Oregon he went to Washington, D.C. and worked for the Bureau of Indian Affairs as an agent. In that capacity, he dealt with the Santee Sioux in the Iowa Territory during the Inkpaduta affair in 1857. Prichette later served as a United States Consul to Fiji, and died aboard the British flagged brig Rona en route from Sydney to California via Huaheine in the Society Islands. He died from an unknown ailment on April 12, 1869, at the age of 68 and was buried at sea.

References

External links
Governor Kintzing Pritchette's Administration: Biographical Note from the Oregon State Archives
Oregon State Archives

Governors of Oregon Territory
Secretaries of State of Michigan
1800 births
Politicians from Detroit
Secretaries of State of Oregon
1869 deaths
Politicians from Philadelphia
19th-century American politicians